Sir John William Bowen CBE (8 May 1876 – 1 April 1965), known as William Bowen, was a British trade unionist and politician.

Born and educated in Gowerton in Glamorgan, Bowen left school aged eleven to work at the Post Office.  He soon became an active trade unionist, joining the Postmen's Federation, of which he became chair in 1916.  He was also active in the Labour Party and stood unsuccessfully for it in Newport, Monmouthshire at the 1918 general election and in several elections subsequently.

In 1919, Bowen moved to London to take up the role of treasurer of the Postmen's Federation.  In this post, he was involved in negotiating the merger of various unions to form the Union of Post Office Workers, and was elected as its first general secretary.  He also served on the General Council of the Trades Union Congress and was on the council of Ruskin College for many years, becoming its chairman in 1948.

Bowen stood for election repeatedly in Newport, at a 1922 by-election and the 1922, 1923 and 1924 general elections, but was never elected.  At the 1929 general election, he instead stood in Crewe and immediately won the seat, but he lost it in 1931 and failed to win it back in 1935.

Bowen stood down as secretary of the Post Office Workers in 1936, and was made a Commander of the Order of the British Empire three years later.  In 1940, he was elected to London County Council for Wandsworth Central.  He lost the seat in 1949, but despite no longer being a member of the council, the Labour group ensured his election as the council's Chair.  He served in the position for three years, winning an aldermanic seat in 1951 to remain on the council after his time as chair finished.  He was knighted in the 1953 Coronation Honours List, and remained on the council until 1961.

References

1876 births
1965 deaths
Labour Party (UK) MPs for English constituencies
UK MPs 1929–1931
Members of London County Council
General Secretaries of the Union of Communication Workers
Labour Party (UK) councillors
Union of Communication Workers-sponsored MPs
Commanders of the Order of the British Empire
Knights Bachelor
British postmen
Politicians from Swansea